Aquiles Priester (born June 25, 1971) is a Namibian-born Brazilian drummer. He is currently the drummer of Brazilian power metal band Hangar, and progressive metal bands Midas Fate and Noturnall. As a tour drummer, Priester has played with Paul Di'Anno, Vinnie Moore, Tony MacAlpine, W.A.S.P. and DragonForce. From 2001 to 2008, he was the drummer of Angra, recording three albums which were certified gold.

Biography
Priester was born in Outjo, South West Africa (now Namibia) to Brazilian parents. His first exposure to the instrument was at age four while watching a jazz ensemble perform on television.

Priester moved to Brazil in 1977, and played football in teams like Foz do Iguaçu in Paraná, ABC, and Guairacá Flamenguinho until 1985. In 1985 he attended the Rock in Rio festival where he decided to become a drummer. Although he began playing on cans, he would eventually assemble a set consisting of a snare, tom (which he borrowed from his school), bass drum, hihat, and a cymbal, which he hung from his roof. His biggest influences are Nicko McBrain of Iron Maiden and Deen Castronovo of Journey.

A local television band called The Tropical Band observed his performances and invited him to play a couple of songs; later the band Stylo Livre (freestyle) recruited him. Priester would struggle for years to come, but eventually find success with metal outfits throughout Brazil, and eventually receive the chance to audition for Angra, in 2000.

In 2006, Priester participated in Fábio Laguna's Freakeys project.

He continued to play with Angra until their hiatus at the end of 2007 but eventually left the band to focus on his other band, Hangar. In 2010, he auditioned, along with six other drummers, for the chance to replace Dream Theater's former drummer, Mike Portnoy. The band ultimately decided to hire Mike Mangini as their new drummer.

In 2013, it was announced that Priester had joined the prog metal band Midas Fate.

On September 9, 2014, Priester was announced as Primal Fear's new drummer on the band's official Facebook page but left the band only months after.

Equipment
Priester has used Mapex Drums since 2001. He also endorses: Paiste Cymbals, Roland, AKG Microphones, JBL, Gibraltar Hardware, Evans Drum Heads, Pro-Mark Sticks, LP Percussion, Planet Waves, DW Pedals, Boss, Ahead Armor Drum Cases, Xtreme Ears, Urban Boards PsychoShoes, Power Click, Consulado do Rock and Lady Snake Rock Wear.

Live musician
 Almah (2007)
 Tony MacAlpine (2012–present)
 Vinnie Moore (2013)
 Primal Fear (2014–2015)
 WASP (2017–present)
 Edu Falaschi (2017–present)
 DragonForce (2020)

Discography

With Angra 
 Rebirth (2001)
 Hunters and Prey (EP) (2002)
 Live in São Paulo (2003)
 Temple of Shadows (2004)
 Aurora Consurgens (2006)

With Di'Anno 
Nomad (2000)

With Freakeys 
 Freakeys (2006)

With Hangar 
 Last Time (1999)
 Inside Your Soul (2001)
 The Reason of Your Conviction (2007)
 Last Time Was Just the Beginning (2008)
 Infallible (2009)
 Acoustic, but Plugged In! (2011)
 The best of 15 years: Based on a true history (2014)
 Stronger Than Ever (2016)
 Live in Brusque/SC Brazil (DVD) (2016)

With Noturnall 
  Noturnall (2014)
  First Night Live (Live DVD) (2014)
  Back to F*ck You up! (2015)
  9 (2017)

With House Of Bones 
  House Of Bones EP(2012)

With About 2 Crash 
 About 2 Crash EP (2015) (only digital)

With Serj Buss 
Liquid Piece of Me (2007)

With Tony MacAlpine 
Concrete Gardens (2015)

With Edu Falaschi 
 The Glory of the Sacred Truth (2018)
 Vera Cruz (2021)

Videography

As a solo artist

 Inside My Drums (2004)
 The Infallible Reason of my Freak Drumming (2010)
 Aquiles Priester's TOP 100 Drum Fills (2013) – Daniel Piquê as video director
 The PsychOctopus Play Along – 10 tracks of Hangar (2014)
 Our Lives, 15 Years Later… Live in Studio! (2016)
 All Access to Aquiles Priester's Drumming (2019)

With Hangar
 Live in Brusque/SC, Brazil (2016)

References

External links
 Aquiles Priester's official website

Angra (band) members
Brazilian drummers
Brazilian heavy metal drummers
Living people
1971 births
South African emigrants to Brazil
21st-century drummers